Themelios (Greek: Θεμέλιος, i.e., foundation or keystone) is a peer-reviewed international evangelical theological journal that expounds on the historic Christian faith. Its primary audience is theological students, pastors and scholars. It was formerly a print journal operated by RTSF/UCCF in the UK, and it became a digital journal operated by The Gospel Coalition in 2008. Also previously it was known as the Theological Students Fellowship (TSF) Bulletin from 1951 to 1957.

References

External links 
 About Themelios
 https://www.thegospelcoalition.org/themelios/issues/ Current and archived issues of Themelios (1975-present)]

Protestant studies journals
Publications established in 1962
English-language journals
Triannual journals